"Who Doesn't Love Love" is a song by Swedish pop boyband The Fooo Conspiracy. The song was released as a digital download in Sweden on 28 October 2016 through Artist House Stockholm. The song did not enter the Swedish Singles Chart, but peaked to number 8 on the Swedish Heatseeker Chart.

Music video
A video to accompany the release of "Who Doesn't Love Love" was first released onto YouTube on 10 November 2016 at a total length of two minutes and thirty-six seconds.

Track listing

Charts

Weekly charts

Release history

References

2016 singles
2016 songs
Songs written by Robert Habolin
FO&O songs